John Imray (12 August 1820 – 29 September 1902) assisted in founding the Chartered Institute of Patent Agents in 1882, and served as President of the Institute from 1884 to 1886, and was therefore the second such President of the Institute.

Biography
He was the son of a Scottish Minister (Reverend John Ross Imray of Longside, Aberdeenshire) and was born at Peterhead on 12 August 1820.

After graduating as a Master of Arts from the Marischal College of Aberdeen, he was employed firstly as an apprentice engineer and thereafter in the "Ventilation Office" at the Houses of Parliament. From 1850 to 1867 he ran an engineering business in London, during which time he was granted many patents for his inventions in the field of railway engineering and steam engines.  He then became a consulting engineer and patent agent. Among his early clients with whom he collaborated was the English philosopher-scientist Matthew Piers Watt Boulton (named after his grandfather, Matthew Boulton and his grandfather's business partner, James Watt). In 1868 M.P.W. Boulton and Imray jointly patented inventions related to "Propelling vessels".  Some of Imray's works were also featured in the 1862 International Exhibition in London.

In 1871, Imray joined Charles Denton Abel, brother of the late Sir Frederick Abel, in partnership as Consulting Engineers and Patent Agents, under the name Abel & Imray. He was frequently employed as an expert in cases of patent litigation, including notable cases such as the "Telephone actions", the "Otto gas-engine actions", the "Westinghouse air-brake actions", and the "Welsbach gas-lighting actions".

Imray assisted in founding the Chartered Institute of Patent Agents in 1882, and served as President of the Institute from 1884 to 1886, and was therefore the second such President of the Institute. He was also a Member of the Institution of Mechanical Engineers and of the Royal Institution.

In 1900, at the age of 80, he became an elected councillor in the Metropolitan Borough of Holborn, representing the South East St. Andrews ward. He was shown as serving on the  "Baths and Washhouses" Committee, Library Committee and Public Health Committee.

John Imray died on 29 September 1902, aged 82.

References

External links 
 Abel & Imray's current website
 Website of the Chartered Institute of Patent Attorneys

1828 births
1900 deaths
Patent attorneys
Members of Holborn Metropolitan Borough Council
Members of Middlesex County Council